Baure may refer to:

 Baure language, an Arawakan language
 Baure, Nigeria, a Local Government Area in Katsina State
 Battle of Baure, Kenya, 2015